Michael John Bell (December 7, 1974 – March 26, 2021) was an American professional baseball third baseman and coach. He played in Major League Baseball (MLB) for the Cincinnati Reds, and was the bench coach of the Minnesota Twins during the 2020 season. He was the brother of David Bell, son of Buddy Bell and grandson of Gus Bell.

Baseball career
Bell attended Moeller High School in Cincinnati, Ohio. The Texas Rangers selected Bell in the first round of the 1993 Major League Baseball draft. He played in Minor League Baseball from 1993 to 2005. In 2000, he played in Major League Baseball for the Cincinnati Reds. With the Reds, Bell batted .222 with two home runs and four runs batted in in 19 games.

In 2007, Bell was named the manager of the Yakima Bears, a minor league affiliate of the Arizona Diamondbacks. He managed the Visalia Rawhide in 2008 and 2009. Bell then served as the director of player development for the Diamondbacks from 2011 through 2016 and as vice president of player development from 2017 through 2019.

On December 17, 2019, the Minnesota Twins named Bell to their coaching staff for the 2020 season, replacing Derek Shelton, who left to manage the Pittsburgh Pirates.

Personal life
Bell and his wife, Kelly, had three children. His father, Buddy Bell, grandfather, Gus Bell, and brother, David Bell, all played in the major leagues.

Bell fell ill in July 2020, and an examination in January 2021 discovered tumors on his kidneys. He underwent a procedure on January 28, and went on indefinite leave from the Twins, working remotely from his Phoenix, Arizona home. Bell died on March 26, 2021, less than two months after his diagnosis.

See also
 Third-generation Major League Baseball families
 List of second-generation Major League Baseball players
 List of Major League Baseball players named in the Mitchell Report

References

External links

1974 births
2021 deaths
Arizona Diamondbacks executives
Baseball players from Cincinnati
Binghamton Mets players
Charleston RiverDogs players
Charlotte Knights players
Charlotte Rangers players
Cincinnati Reds players
Colorado Springs Sky Sox players
Gulf Coast Rangers players
Louisville RiverBats players
Major League Baseball bench coaches
Major League Baseball farm directors
Major League Baseball third basemen
Memphis Redbirds players
Minnesota Twins coaches
Minor league baseball coaches
Minor league baseball managers
Norfolk Tides players
Oklahoma City 89ers players
St. Lucie Mets players
Salem Avalanche players
Tucson Sidewinders players
Tulsa Drillers players
Deaths from kidney cancer
Deaths from cancer in Arizona